Daniel Amos is an American Christian rock band.

Daniel Amos may also refer to:

 Daniel Amos (album), self-titled album by the rock band
 Dan Amos (born 1951), chief executive officer of insurer Aflac
 Danny Amos (footballer, born 1987), Israeli professional footballer 
 Danny Amos (footballer, born 1999), English-born Northern Irish footballer

Amos, Daniel